Irina Vladimirovna Brazgovka (born November 12, 1954, Minsk) is a Soviet and Russian actress of theater and cinema.

Biography

Career 
She started acting in the cinema from the age of seven.   She graduated from the acting department of VGIK (workshop of Sergey Bondarchuk and Irina Skobtseva). She performed in the ensemble of Dmitry Pokrovsky. She starred in more than 60 films and serials.

Personal life 
The actress's father is Deputy Minister of Public Utilities of the Republic of Belarus Vladimir Andreevich Brazgovka. Mother - a teacher in Russian, a teacher of Russian for foreigners Nina Vladimirovna Gedemin.

There are two children. The oldest daughter, Daria, the daughter of Andrei Konchalovsky, works on the BUM Сhannel. The youngest daughter is Alexandra Brazgovka, designer.

Selected filmography 
 I'm Going to Look For (1966) as Valya
 On the Wolf Track (1976) as Varvara
 Vertical Race (1982) as Lyuda
 Farewell  (1983) as    girl on a mowing
 Dead Souls  (1984) as  young merchant
War is Over. Please Forget... (1997) as mother
 The Tulse Luper Suitcases: The Moab Story (2004) as Katerina
 Moscow Saga (2004) as Klavdiya
 Doctor Zhivago (2006) as Anna Ivanovna Gromeko
 Dead Daughters (2007) as usherette
 Kitchen (2012) as Jael Kopas, an elite film director from Romania
Kuprin. Pit (2014) as landlady
Icaria  (2019) as Lyubov Viktorovna

Awards and nominations 
 Nika Award (1998): Best Actress (nomination) — War is Over. Please Forget...

References

External links

 Ирина Бразговка, актриса: биография, роли, фильмы, фото

1954 births
Living people
Actors from Minsk
Russian film actresses
Russian television actresses
Russian stage actresses
Soviet film actresses
Soviet television actresses
Soviet stage actresses
Gerasimov Institute of Cinematography alumni
Soviet child actresses